Eyres may refer to:

People
 Annabel Eyres (born 1965), British rower and artist
 Bolton Eyres-Monsell, 1st Viscount Monsell (1881–1969), British politician
 David Eyres (born 1964), English football player
 Erica Eyres (born 1980), Canadian artist
 Gordon Eyres (1912–2004), Australian cricket player
 Graham Eyres-Monsell, 2nd Viscount Monsell
 Harry Charles Augustus Eyres (1856–1944), British diplomat
 Harry Eyres, British journalist, writer and poet
 Jack Eyres (1899–1975), English football player
 Leslie Harvey Eyres (1892–1983), Canadian politician
 Nathan Eyres-Brown (born 1989), Australian rugby union football player
 Richard Eyres (born 1966), English rugby league and rugby union football player
 Robert Eyres Landor Landor (1781–1869), English writer, dramatist, poet and clergyman

Places
 Eyres Bay, Antarctica
 Eyres Monsell, England
 Eyres-Moncube, France

Other
 Eyres skink, species of skink